The Oklahoma City Slickers was the name given to two different American soccer clubs based in Oklahoma City. The first team competed in the second American Soccer League in 1982 and 1983, and as the Oklahoma City Stampede in the United Soccer League in 1984 and 1985. The second Oklahoma City Slickers competed in the USISL from 1993 to 1996.

Oklahoma City Slickers (1982–85)
In 1982, the first Oklahoma City Slickers joined the de facto second division American Soccer League.  The Slickers went to the championship series, losing to the Detroit Express. Head coach Brian Harvey was the ASL Coach of the Year.  In 1983, the Slickers finished last in the league. The American Soccer League collapsed following the 1983 season.  This led to the creation of the United Soccer League in 1984. The Slickers joined the new league, changing their name to the Oklahoma City Stampede.  The club once again came tantalizingly close to a league championship, winning the regular-season title on point differential over the Fort Lauderdale Sun but falling in the semifinals to the Houston Dynamos in a three-game series. This success was short-lived. After the 1984 season, the club relocated to Tulsa, Oklahoma at the Tulsa Tornados, with Brian Harvey still serving as head coach. The USL folded in the spring of 1985 after just a handful of games. During its short existence, Oklahoma City's best-known players were goalkeeper Phil Parkes and Jeff Bourne, both veterans of the North American Soccer League and English First Division. Home games were played at historical (but woefully narrow for soccer purposes) Taft Stadium in Oklahoma City.

Year-by-year

Notable players
 Jeff Bourne (1982) 20 Goals
 David Kemp (1984)
 Phil Parkes (1982) 28 Games 0 Goals
 Thompson Usiyan (1984)
 Delroy Allen (1984) 22 Apps 0 Goals

Oklahoma City Slickers (1993–96)
In February 1993, the United States Interregional Soccer League announced the merger of the Oklahoma City Warriors of the USISL and the Oklahoma City Spirit of the Lone Star Soccer Alliance.  The new team would compete in the USISL using the name the Oklahoma City Slickers.  Brian Harvey coached the Slickers in their first year with Warriors head coach Chico Villar serving as an assistant and team general manager.  The team also returned to Taft Stadium.  In 1994, Duane Cummings replaced Harvey as head coach.  The Slickers withdrew from the league and disbanded after the 1995–96 USISL indoor season.

Year-by-year

References

United Soccer League (1984–85) teams
Soccer clubs in Oklahoma City
Defunct soccer clubs in Oklahoma
American Soccer League (1933–1983) teams
1982 establishments in Oklahoma
1985 disestablishments in Oklahoma
Soccer clubs in Oklahoma
Association football clubs established in 1982
Association football clubs disestablished in 1985
Association football clubs established in 1993
Association football clubs disestablished in 1996
1993 establishments in Oklahoma
1996 disestablishments in Oklahoma
Defunct indoor soccer clubs in the United States